The Yamaha Gladiator alias YBR 125 is a 125 cc motorcycle, developed by India Yamaha Motor.  Production began in 2006.

The bike can be started in any gear and offers excellent corner handling.

Marketing

At the launch of Yamaha Gladiator in India, Yamaha announced said that it planned to sell 4 lakh bikes in India and six lakhs later. Yamaha would also be setting up a new plant to manufacture two wheelers in India between 2008 and 2010.

Features and specifications

References

Gladiator
Motorcycles introduced in 2006

hu:Yamaha Gladiator